Catherine of Valois (1401–1437) was the wife of Henry V, and Queen consort of England from 1420 to 1422.

Catherine of Valois may also refer to:

 Catherine of Courtenay (1274–1307), wife of Count Charles of Valois
 Catherine of Valois (1303–1346), daughter of Count Charles of Valois, and titular Empress of Constantinople as Catherine II from 1308 to 1346
 Catherine of Valois (1378–1388), youngest child of Charles V of France
 Catherine of Valois (1428–1446), daughter of Charles VII of France and Marie of Anjou.  Wife of Charles the Rash.

See also 
 Catherine of France (disambiguation)